Poleck is a surname. Notable people with the surname include:

Fritz Poleck (1905–1989), German army officer 
Theodor Poleck (1821–1906), German chemist and pharmacist